C-109 may refer to :
 C-109 Liberator Express, a conversion of the American B-24 Liberator bomber as a cargo aircraft
 Caudron C.109, a light utility aircraft built in France in the late 1920s
 CC-109 Cosmopolitan, a Canadian turboprop version of the Convairliner for use as a transport by the RCAF